Wild Ones is the fourth studio album by American rapper Flo Rida. It was released on July 3, 2012. Wild Ones had four Top 10 singles on the US Billboard Hot 100, when the singles, "Good Feeling", "Wild Ones", "Whistle", and "I Cry" charted at three, five, one, and six respectively.

Singles 
On August 21, 2011, Flo Rida released the album's lead single, titled "Good Feeling", that samples Etta James' song "Something's Got a Hold on Me". Produced by Dr. Luke and Cirkut, the song did inspire "Levels" performed by Avicii, which also contains the Etta James sample. The song was very successful all across the world, peaking at number 3 on the US Billboard Hot 100 and also it became certified 3× platinum for shipping around two million copies in the US alone.

The album's title track was released as the album's second single on December 19, 2011, and it features Australian singer-songwriter Sia as a vocalist. The song has sold 3,000,000 copies domestically and over 6,000,000 copies globally. The album's third single "Whistle" produced by DJ Frank E, was first played on April 16, 2012, on The Kyle and Jackie O Show on Sydney radio station 2Day FM. The single reached a peak at number one on the US Billboard Hot 100, which it became very successful around the world.

The album's fourth single, "I Cry", was inspired by "Cry (Just a Little)" performed by Bingo Players, which samples "Piano in the Dark" performed by Brenda Russell. The single reached the top ten in Canada, France, the UK and the US. A remix of Sweet Spot featuring Jennifer Lopez was released March 13, 2013. The album's sixth single "Let It Roll" was released March 22, 2013. The single reached the top 20 in the UK.

Promotional singles 
Both of the promotional singles in which were released before the album's release, "Hey Jasmin" was released on June 6, 2012, with an accompanying music video. "Let it Roll" was released digitally on June 19, 2012.

Reception

Commercial performance 
The album debuted at number 14 on the US Billboard 200 chart, selling 31,000 copies in its first week. To date, the album has sold 311,000 copies in the United States.

Critical response 

Upon its release, Wild Ones received mixed reviews from music critics. At Metacritic, which assigns an average rating out of 100 to reviews from mainstream critics, the album received an average score of 54, based on ten reviews, indicating "mixed or average reviews". Although he perceived the album's creative scope to be limited, David Jeffries of Allmusic called Wild Ones "gimmicky, lightweight, and best taken in small chunks, but get a glitter-friendly crowd together and it gets the party started, succeeding at its one and only goal". He also observed the album's material to be largely "hot, infectious fluff", but felt that the album "would be dragged down by any tacked-on sense of purpose, and thinking of Flo Rida as equal parts thrill seeker and hitmaker is easy". However, Rolling Stones Jody Rosen felt the album's production to be too inconsistent, observing that the album's "inhumanly supersized... dance beats" were either "genius" or "insipid", also writing that Flo Rida "[is] content to surrender center-stage on his producers". Complex called the album cover art the sixth worst cover of 2012.

The title track received a Grammy Award for Best Rap/Sung Performance nomination for Flo Rida and Sia.

Track listing 

Notes
 denotes additional producer
 denotes co-producer
 denotes vocal producer
 denotes remix producer
 "Let It Roll" contains elements of "Come On (Part I)" performed by Freddie King and written by Earl King.
 "I Cry" contains elements of "Piano in the Dark" performed by Brenda Russell and written by Scott Cutler, Russell and Jeff Hull.
 "Good Feeling" contains elements of "Something's Got a Hold on Me" performed by Etta James and written by Etta James, Leroy Kirkland, and Pearl Woods.
 "Run" contains elements of "Run to You" performed by Bryan Adams and written by Jim Vallance and Bryan Adams, and it also contains small elements of Party Rock Anthem and Sexy and I Know It performed by the electropop group LMFAO.
 "In My Mind, Part 2" contains elements of the Axwell mix of "In My Mind" performed by Ivan Gough and Feenixpawl featuring Georgi Kay.

Personnel
Unless otherwise noted, Credits are taken from the album's Liner Notes.

 Flo Rida - Vocals (2, 4, Lead on 1, 3, 6–9, Additional on 5)
 Tyler Acord - Recording Engineer (8)
 John Armstrong - Recording Engineer (additional on 1)
 Diego Avendaño - Assistant Recording Engineer (7)
 Axwell - Drum Machine (2-3, 5), Instruments (other on 2, additional on 3, 5) 
 Tim Bergling - Vocal Arrangement (4)
 Delbert Bowers - Assistant Audio Mixing (1, 3, 5–6, 8)
 Candice Boyd - Background Vocals (8)
 Nathan Burgess - Assistant Audio Mixing (7)
 Yoan "Odd Fellow" Chirescu - Guitar (2)
 Cirkut - Music Programming, Additional Instruments (4)
 DJ Frank E - Whistles, Drums, Keyboards, Synthesizers, Sound Effects (1) 
 Julie Frost - Additional Vocals (6)
 Dr. Luke - Music Programming, Additional Instruments (4) 
 Mike Freesh - Sound Effects Assistance, Drums, Bass played by (1) 
 The Futuristics - Music Programming, Additional Instruments (8)
 Chris Galland - Assistant Audio Mixing (1-3, 5–6, 8),
 Serban Ghenea - Audio Mixing (4)
 Clint Gibbs - Assistant Recording Engineer (4)
 David Glass - Guitar, Recording Engineer (1) 
 Eric Goudy II - Drum Machine (7)
 Ivan Gough - Sampled Background Vocals (5)
 Josh Gudwin - Recording Engineer (6)
 John Hanes - Recording Engineer (4)
 Nico Hartikainen - Recording Engineer (7, additional on 6)
 Earl Hood - Drum Machine (7)
 Matt Huber - Assistant Audio Mixing (7)
 Breyan Isaac - Background Vocals (3, 6–7)
 Ava James - Assistant Recording Engineer (4)
 Georgi Kay - Lead Vocals (5)
 Rob Kleiner - Recording Engineer (2)
 Jennifer Lopez - Lead Vocals (6)
 Erik Madrid - Assistant Audio Mixing (2)
 Audra Mae - Additional Vocals (9)
 Robert Marks - Audio Mixing (7)
 Manny Marroquin - Audio Mixing (1-3, 5–6, 8)
 Trent Mazur - Sound Effects Assistance, Guitar, Keyboards (1)
 Thurston McCrea - Recording Engineer (7)
 Pierre Medor - Keyboards (7)
 Antonio Mobley - Background Vocals (3, 6–7)
 Skylar Mones - Assistant Recording Engineer (4)
 Juan P. Negrete - Recording Engineer (1-3, 5–6, 8–9, assistant on 4)
 Chris "Tek" O’Ryan - Recording Engineer (6)
 Robert Orton - Audio Mixing (9)
 Ash Pournouri - Vocal Arrangement (4)
 Redfoo - Lead Vocals (9)
 Phil Seaford - Assistant Mixing Engineer (4)
 Fio "Alastor" Shkreli - Sound Effects (1)
 Emily Wright - Recording Engineer (4)

Charts

Weekly charts

Year-end charts

Certifications

References

External links 
 Wild Ones at Metacritic
 Wild ones album artwork

2012 albums
Flo Rida albums
Albums produced by Cirkut
Albums produced by DJ Frank E
Albums produced by Dr. Luke
Albums produced by Rico Love
Atlantic Records albums
Dance music albums by American artists